Argentojarosite is an iron sulfate mineral with the chemical formula AgFe(SO)(OH). It is one of few iron sulfate minerals containing silver in its chemical formula as a dominant element. Its type locality is the East Tintic Mountains, Utah.

References

External links 
 Argentojarosite on the Handbook of Mineralogy

Bibliography
Palache, P.; Berman H.; Frondel, C. (1960). "Dana's System of Mineralogy, Volume II: Halides, Nitrates, Borates, Carbonates, Sulfates, Phosphates, Arsenates, Tungstates, Molybdates, Etc. (Seventh Edition)" John Wiley and Sons, Inc., New York, pp. 565.

Iron(III) minerals
Sulfate minerals
Alunite group